hCentive, Inc., is Virginia based (Reston, Virginia) software development company specializing in cloud-based products for health insurers and state health agencies. hCentive is a pioneer in building a health insurance exchange solution from the ground-up post the Affordable Care Act (ACA).

hCentive is involved in the development of state and private health insurance marketplaces, namely exchanges, for state organizations, health insurance providers, companies, and third party administrators. Company works with three of the top five health insurance organizations in the US.

About 125 employees of hCentive work at the corporate headquarters. The others are based at the Indian R&D center.

History 
hCentive was founded in 2009 by Sanjay Singh, Manoj Agarwala and Tarun Upaday. They started their activities before the Affordable Care Act became law, expecting that it would create the new market. The idea of founding the hCentive company emerged from concepts of the Affordable Care Act- ACA, when health care reform was being debated in the United States Congress.

Products and services
hCentive's WebInsure State is a cloud-hosted solution for state-based health insurance exchanges . It is adopted by the states of New York, Colorado and Kentucky for their state health insurance marketplaces.

Company's WebInsure Private Exchange solution is created specially for the private market: It is a cloud-based solution to be used for health plans, TPAs, and dental plans. 

Another private market solution, WebInsure Exchange Manager, serves the purpose of integration between health insurance exchange, health insurance providers, and other related parties.

In August, 2013, Geisinger Health Plan (GHP), a health insurance provider, began cooperation with hCentive to implement health insurance exchange integration and private exchange solutions.

Awards & Recognitions 
Rank of No. 62 on the Deloitte Technology Fast 500 in North American, No. 117 on the Inc. 5000 2014 list and No. 12 on the Washington Business Journal Fast 50 in 2015.

Ranked No. 19 among Virginia-based companies and was ranked No. 117 on the Inc. 5000 2014 list.

References

External links 
 

Cloud computing providers
Cloud platforms
Software companies based in Virginia
Technology companies established in 2009
Defunct software companies of the United States